The 10th Parliament of Lower Canada was in session from April 11, 1820, to April 24, 1820. Elections to the Legislative Assembly in Lower Canada had been held in March 1820. The legislature was dissolved due to the death of King George III. All sessions were held at Quebec City.

References

External links
  Assemblée nationale du Québec (French)
Journals of the House of Assembly of Lower Canada ..., John Neilson (1820)

Parliaments of Lower Canada
1820 establishments in Lower Canada
1820 disestablishments in Lower Canada